Givatayim (lit. "two hills") is a city in Israel east of Tel Aviv. It is part of the metropolitan area known as Gush Dan. Givatayim was established in 1922 by pioneers of the Second Aliyah.

The name of the city comes from the "two hills" on which it was established: Borochov Hill and Kozlovsky Hill. The city was expanded in the 1930s so that today it is actually situated on 4 hills, Borochov, Kozlovsky, the Poalei HaRakevet ("railroad workers'"), and Rambam Hill.

Geography
Givatayim is located east of Tel Aviv, and is bordered on the north and east by Ramat Gan.

History

Antiquity
Archaeological remains of a Calcolithic settlement have been found at the site of what is now Givatayim.

British Mandate era

The modern town was founded on April 2, 1922 by a group of 22 Second Aliyah pioneers led by David Schneiderman. The group purchased 300 dunams of land on the outskirts of Tel Aviv that became the Borochov Neighbourhood (Shechunat/Shekhunat Borochov), the first workers' neighbourhood in the country. It was named for Dov Ber Borochov, founder of the Poalei Zion workers' party. Later, another 70 families joined the group, receiving smaller plots. The land was purchased with their private savings, but was voluntarily transferred to the Jewish National Fund, which organized Jewish settlement at the time, in keeping with the pioneers' socialist beliefs.

Shechunat Borochov is credited for a number of innovations in the early Jewish settlement movement, including establishing the first cooperative grocery store (Tzarkhaniya, "Consumer") that still functioned in the same location into the 1980s.

Over time, more neighborhoods developed: Sheinkin (1936; named after Menahem Sheinkin), Givat Rambam (1933; named after Maimonides), Kiryat Yosef (1934; named after the biblical figure), and Arlozorov (1936; named after Haim Arlosoroff).

All these neighborhoods were merged to form a local council in August 1942.

State of Israel
Givatayim was declared a city in 1959.

Education and culture

Givatayim has 41 kindergartens, 9 elementary schools and 4 high schools. As of 2018, the city has one of the highest rate of secondary school matriculation in the country. Mayor Ruven Ben-Shachar initiated a special high school exam assistance program that after 3 years resulted in an 11% increase of high school test results in 2010.

Thelma Yellin High School for the Arts alumni include Shai Maestro, Shira Haas, Ohad Knoller, Ilanit, Mili Avital, Ziv Koren, Yael Tal and Maya Dunietz.

Urban development
Eurocom Tower is a 70-story skyscraper consisting of four apartment towers and a 50-story office building. A large square connects to surrounding areas with bridges and underground passes. The complex is near Ramat Gan and its Diamond Exchange District.

In addition to Eurocom Tower, other high-rise projects are planned for the city. According to former Givatayim mayor Reuven Ben-Shahar, the municipality's policy is to promote high-rise construction on the city's outer edges, while preserving the fabric of residential neighborhoods deeper within the city, including the city center. Current plans for the northwest of the city envision high-rise towers along Katznelson and Aliyat Hanoar Streets near the boundaries of Tel Aviv and Ramat Gan. As part of the redevelopment, Katznelson Street will be colonnaded along its length and a 2-meter-wide cycle paths are planned for both sides of the road, with one lane for buses and another for cars.

Mayors
 Shimon Ben-Zvi (1941–1965)
 Kuba Kraizman (1965–1978)
 Yitzhak Yaron (1978–1993)
 Efi (Ephraim) Stenzler (1993–2006)
 Iris Avram, replaced the previous mayor due to his early resignation after he became the chairman of KKL - the Jewish National Fund (2006–2007)
 Reuven Ben-Shahar (2007–2013)
 Ran Kunik (2013–present)
Reuven Ben-Shahar was the first candidate from Kadima that won a city election and the first mayor in Givatayim that was not from the Israeli Labor Party

Notable people
Avi Belleli (born 1963), singer
Dvora Bochman (born 1950), artist
Izhar Cohen (born 1951), singer, Eurovision song contest winner
Tal Erel (born 1996), Israel National Baseball Team player
Oded Kattash (born 1974), basketball player and coach
Tzipora Obziler (born 1973), tennis player
Mickey Rosenthal (born 1955), Labor Party Member of the Knesset
Yuval Semo (born 1969), actor and comedian
A. B. Yehoshua (born 1936), novelist and public intellectual
Oren Moverman (born 1966), filmmaker

Twin towns & sister cities

Givatayim is twinned with:

 Chattanooga, United States
 Esslingen (district), Germany
 Harbin, China
 Mulhouse, France
 Oradea, Romania
 Sfântu Gheorghe, Romania
 Vác, Hungary

See also
HaShahar Tower

References

External links
Official website 
Shechunat Borochov settlement and its "Girls Farm", photos from the 1930s at Alamy. Accessed 7 Dec. 2020.

 
Populated places established in 1922
Cities in Israel
Cities in Tel Aviv District